Signature forgery refers to the act of falsely replicating another person's signature.

Methods
Several different methods can be used to forge signatures. One method is the "freehand method", whereby the forger, after careful practice, replicates the signature by freehand. Although a difficult method to perfect, this often produces the most convincing results. 

In the "trace-over method", the sheet of paper containing the genuine signature is placed on top of the paper where the forgery is required. The signature is traced over, appearing as a faint indentation on the sheet of paper underneath. This indentation can then be used as a guide for a signature.

Detection
A number of characteristics can suggest to an examiner that a signature has been forged, mostly stemming from the forger focusing on accuracy rather than fluency. These include:
 Shaky handwriting
 Pen lifts
 Signs of retouching
 Letter proportions
 Very close similarity between two or more signatures

References

Forgery